Witches' Sabbath or The Great He-Goat are names given to an oil mural by the Spanish artist Francisco Goya, completed sometime between 1821 and 1823. It explores themes of violence, intimidation, aging and death. Satan hulks, in the form of a goat, in moonlit silhouette over a coven of terrified witches. Goya was then around 75 years old, living alone and suffering from acute mental and physical distress.

It is one of the fourteen Black Paintings that Goya applied in oil on the plaster walls of his house, the Quinta del Sordo. The paintings were completed in secret: he did not title any of the works or leave a record of his intentions in creating them. Absent of fact, Witches' Sabbath is generally seen by some art historians as a satire on the credulity of the age, a condemnation of superstition and the witch trials of the Spanish Inquisition. As with the other works in the group, Witches' Sabbath reflects its painter's disillusionment and can be linked thematically to his earlier etching The Sleep of Reason Produces Monsters as well as the Disasters of War print series, another bold political statement published only posthumously.

Around 1874, some fifty years after his death, the plaster murals were taken down and transferred to canvas supports. Witches' Sabbath was much wider before transfer – it was the broadest of the Black Paintings. At its reduced dimensions of 141 × 436 cm (56 × 172 in), its framing is unusually tightly cropped, which some critics find adds to its haunted, spectral aura, although others believe it distorts Goya's intentions by moving the centre of balance and reducing the painting's impact.

Background
Goya did not title any of the 14 Black Paintings; their modern names came about after his death. They are not inscribed, mentioned in his letters, and there are no records of him speaking of them. The works today are known by a variety of titles, most of which date to around the 1860s: his children were largely responsible for the names, with close friend Bernardo de Iriarte contributing the rest. The title El Gran Cabrón (The Great He-Goat) was given by painter Antonio Brugada (1804–1863). The Basque term for a Witches' Sabbath, akelarre, is the source of the Spanish title Aquelarre and a derivation of akerra, the Basque word for a male goat, which may have been combined with the word larre ("field") to arrive at akelarre.

The historical record of Goya's later life is relatively scant; no accounts of his thoughts from this time survive. He deliberately suppressed a number of his works from this period – most notably the Disasters of War series – which are today considered amongst his finest. He was tormented by a dread of old age and fear of madness, the latter possibly from anxiety caused by an undiagnosed illness that left him deaf from the early 1790s. Goya had been a successful and royally placed artist, but withdrew from public life during his final years. From the late 1810s he lived in near-solitude outside Madrid in a farmhouse converted into a studio. The house had become known as la Quinta del Sordo ("the House of the Deaf Man"), after the nearest farmhouse had coincidentally also belonged to a deaf man.

Art historians assume Goya felt alienated from the social and political trends that followed the 1814 restoration of the Bourbon monarchy, and that he viewed these developments as reactionary means of social control. In his unpublished art he seems to have railed against what he saw as a tactical retreat into Medievalism. It is thought that he had hoped for political and religious reform, but like many liberals became disillusioned when the restored Bourbon monarchy and Catholic hierarchy rejected the Spanish Constitution of 1812.

Goya went to exile in France in 1824, and ownership of the house passed to his grandson Mariano. An 1830 inventory by Brugada indicates that the work took a full wall between two windows on the first floor, opposite A Pilgrimage to San Isidro. On the wall to the right were Saturn Devouring His Son and Judith and Holofernes. La Leocadia, Two Old Men and Two Old Ones Eating Soup were on the left wall. Art historian Lawrence Gowing observed that the lower floor was divided thematically, with a male side – Saturn and A Pilgrimage to San Isidro – and a female side – Judith and Holofernes, Witches' Sabbath and La Leocadia. The house changed owners a number of times before March 1873, when it came into the possession of the Belgian Frédéric Émile d'Erlanger, who speculated that the area would appreciate in value over the coming years. The murals had deteriorated badly after many years on the walls. To preserve them, the new owner of the house had them transferred to canvas under the direction of the art restorer of the Museo del Prado, Salvador Martínez Cubells. Following their exhibition at the Paris Exposition Universelle in 1878, where they were met with little reaction, d'Erlanger donated them to the Spanish state in 1881.

Description

Satan preaches from a raised earth mound and is dressed in clerical clothing that may be a soutane. He has a goat-like beard and horns, and stands in silhouette, accentuating his heavy body and gaping mouth, which is depicted as if he is screaming. His form may be derived from a 1652 illustration of the Canaanite idol Molech, as illustrated by Athanasius Kircher.

He holds court before a circle of crouched and mostly terrified women, accepted by art historians as a coven of witches. Some bow their heads in fear, others look towards him in open-mouthed and rapt awe. Describing the women, art historian Brian McQuade writes that the "sub-humanity of the gathered group is underlined by their bestial features and moronic stares". Satan's absolute power over the women has been compared to that of the king in Goya's 1815 The Junta of the Philippines, where authority is gained not from respect or personal charisma, but through fear and domination. The women are a mixture of old and young, and have similar twisted features; all but one are scowling, nervous and obsequious. Goya's use of tone to create atmosphere is reminiscent of both Velázquez and Jusepe de Ribera. The latter was an admirer of Caravaggio and utilised tenebrism and chiaroscuro. Goya learned from these sources, and from Rembrandt, some of whose prints he owned.

An old woman sits to the right of the goat, her back to the viewer. Her face is half hidden, and she wears a white-hooded headdress resembling a nun's habit. She sits alongside bottles and vials on the ground to her right. Art critic Robert Hughes wonders if they "contain the drugs and philtres needed for the devilish ceremonies". The eyes of some figures are lined with white paint. The faces of the two main figures – the goat and the woman to the far right – are hidden. The woman is separated from the group; she is perhaps a postulant about to be initiated into the coven. She may represent Goya's maid and probable lover Leocadia Weiss, whose full-length portrait appears in the same series.

As with the other Black Paintings, Goya began with a black background which he painted over with lighter pigments, then with broad, heavy brushstrokes of grey, blue and brown. The darker areas were achieved by leaving the black under-paint exposed; this is most obvious in the figure of the Devil. Like the other works in the series, Witches' Sabbath is worked up through heavy, slashing brushstrokes. The plaster was underlaid with thick carbon black before the paint was applied in hues of white lead, Prussian blue, vermilion of mercury, and crystals of powdered glass, orpiment and iron oxides. He likely worked with mixed materials. Technical analysis indicates that most of the Black Paintings began with preparatory drawings. Witches' Sabbath is the exception; the final composition seems to have been painted directly onto the wall.

Art historian Fred Licht notes that Goya's brushwork appears "clumsy, ponderous, and rough" and lacking finish compared to his earlier work. Licht believes this was a deliberate ploy to physically convey dismay at human inadequacy and his own feelings of personal doubt. Unique in the series, Witches' Sabbath was not significantly altered by Goya after his initial work.

Interpretation

There is no record of Goya's thoughts during this period. He completed the series during a period recuperating from illness, possibly lead poisoning, when he was in considerable mental and physical pain, and withdrew from public life. Witches' Sabbath is believed to be a rather bitter, but silent, protest against the royalists and clergy who had retaken control of Spain after the Peninsular War of 1807–14. Advocates of the Enlightenment had sought to redistribute land to the peasants, to educate women, publish a vernacular Bible and, by replacing superstition with reason, put an end to the Inquisition. Witch hunting, seen during the Logroño Inquisition, was an appalling regression to liberals such as Goya. As court painter Goya was a part of the established order; surviving evidence indicates he was acquiesced to the wishes of his patrons. Yet numerous paintings and etchings have emerged since, suggesting he had convictions favouring liberalism, enlightenment, and reason. He seems to have kept such beliefs private, only expressing them in his private art; his more sensitive works were not published at the time, probably for fear of reprisal or persecution. In Witches' Sabbath Goya mocks and ridicules the superstition, fear and irrationality of the ignorant placing their faith in ghouls, quack doctors and tyrants.

Goya had used witchcraft imagery in his 1797–98 Caprichos print series, and in his similarly titled 1789 painting Witches' Sabbath. In both the 1789 and 1822 Sabbath pictures, the Devil is presented as a goat surrounded by a ring of terrified women. The earlier painting uses witchcraft imagery in a manner that inverts the order of traditional Christian iconography. The goat extends his left rather than right hoof towards the child, the quarter moon faces out at the left hand corner of the canvas. These inversions may be metaphor for the irrational undermining of the liberals who argued for scientific, religious and social progress.  Many of the scientific bodies then active were condemned as subversive and their members accused as "agents of the devil".

Describing the techniques employed in the Black Paintings, particularly the visible black ground paint, art historian Barbara Stafford said that "by brusquely inlaying spots of light with prevailing darkness, Goya's aquatinted and painted visions demonstrated the powerlessness of the unmoored intellect to unify a monstrously hybrid experience according to its own a priori transcendental laws."

Restoration

Between 1874 and 1878 restorer Salvador Martinez Cubells was tasked with retouching the goat's horns and a number of the witches' faces. This alteration significantly shifted the work's centre of balance; the young woman was no longer near the middle of the composition, thus reducing both her prominence and the possibility that she is seen to be the focus of the work.

Some art historians have speculated that the area removed was beyond restoration since it is unlikely that such a large section of painting by an artist of Goya's stature would be lightly discarded. Still, the removal may have been for aesthetic reasons, with the empty space on the right viewed as unnecessary; its removal intended to bring balance to a canvas perceived as overlong. If this was Cubells' reasoning, it was misguided (he was not an accomplished painter and lacked insight into Goya's intentions); Goya had often used empty space to dramatic and evocative effect.

This can be seen in both The Dog from the same series, and his print Unfortunate events in the front seats of the ring of Madrid, and the death of the Mayor of Torrejón, where he left large empty areas. This seems to have been a reaction against contemporary conventions of balance and harmony, and was a precursor to works by modern artists such as Francis Bacon, who greatly admired Goya's depiction of what Bacon described as "the void".

Condition
The painting is in poor condition. Time and a complicated transfer – which involved mounting crumbling plaster onto canvas – have caused extensive damage and significant paint loss. The work seems to have been seriously damaged even before its removal from the walls of Goya's home; the base of dry plaster may have contributed to its early deterioration. Frescos completed on dry (rather than wet) plaster cannot survive for a long period on a roughened surface. Evan Connell believes that in applying oil to plaster Goya "made a technical mistake that all but guaranteed disintegration".

Many of the Black Paintings were significantly altered during the restoration of the 1870s, and critic Arthur Lubow describes the works hanging in the Prado today as "at best a crude facsimile of what Goya painted". We know the effect of many of Martinez Cubells' changes from his accounts, but they inevitably lack objectivity. More reliable are two overlapping photographs taken in preparation for the restoration by Jean Laurent, now in the Courtauld Institute's Witt Library.

They show the painting in situ in the Quinta del Sordo and are the most reliable indicators of its appearance before restoration. But Laurent's work presents difficulties, not least because some areas of the photographs lack resolution and contain indistinct passages. Photographs from this period tended to darken yellow and red areas while lightening blues and violets.

References

Notes

Sources

 Acton, Mary. Learning to Look at Paintings. New York: Routledge, 1997. 
 Boime, Albert. Art in an Age of Counterrevolution, 1815–1848. Chicago: Chicago University Press, 2004. 
 Buchholz, Elke Linda. Francisco de Goya. Cologne: Könemann, 1999. 
 Connell, Evan S. Francisco Goya: A Life. New York: Counterpoint, 2004. 
 Dowling, John. "Buero Vallejo's Interpretation of Goya's Black Paintings". Hispania, Volume 56, No. 2, May 1973 
 Gale, Matthew; Stephens, Chris. Francis Bacon. New York: Skira Rizzoli, 2009.  
 Gallucci, Margaret. "The Witch as Muse: Art, Gender, and Power in Early Modern Europe". Renaissance Quarterly, Volume 59, Issue 1, 2006 
 Glendinning, Nigel. "The Strange Translation of Goya's Black Paintings". The Burlington Magazine, Volume 117, No. 868, 1975 
 Gowing, Lawrence. "Book review: Goya's 'Black' Paintings. Truth and Reason in Light and Liberty by Priscilla E. Muller". The Burlington Magazine, Volume 128, No. 1000, July 1986
 Hagen, Rose-Marie & Hagen, Rainer. Francisco Goya, 1746–1828. London: Taschen, 2003. 
 Havard, Robert. The Spanish Eye: Painters and Poets of Spain. Suffolk: Tamesis Books, 2007
 Hughes, Robert. Goya. New York: Alfred A. Knopf, 2004. 
 Junquera, Juan José. The Black Paintings of Goya. London: Scala Publishers, 2008. 
 Licht, Fred. Goya: The Origins of the Modern Temper in Art. University of Michigan: Universe Books, 1979. 
 Lima, Robert. Stages of Evil: Occultism in Western Theater and Drama. Lexington: University Press of Kentucky, 2006. 
 Murray, Christopher John. Encyclopedia of the Romantic Era, 1760–1850, Volume 1. New York: Routledge. 
 Nilsson, Stenake. "The Ass Sequence in Los Caprichos". Journal of Art History, Volume 47, Issue 1, 1978
 Posèq, Avigdor. "The Goat in Goya's Witches' Sabbaths". Notes in the History of Art, Volume 18, No. 4, 1999
 Stafford, Barbara Maria. Visual Analogy: Consciousness as the Art of Connecting. Boston, MA: MIT Press, 2001. 82. 
 Vertova, Luisa. "Treasures from Florentine Houses". The Burlington Magazine, Volume 102, No. 692, November 1960

Further reading

 Gallucci, Margaret. "The Witch as Muse: Art, Gender, and Power in Early Modern Europe". Renaissance Quarterly, Volume 59, Issue 1, 2006
 Myers, Bernard. Goya. London: Spring Art Books, 1964
 Wight, Frederick. "The Revulsions of Goya: Subconscious Communications in the Etchings". Journal of Aesthetics and Art Criticism, Volume 5, No. 1, September 1946

External links
 At the Museo del Prado 
 Digital tour of the Quinta del Sordo

1820s paintings
Paintings by Francisco Goya in the Museo del Prado
Witches in art
Goats in art
Witchcraft in Spain